The San Jose State Spartans baseball team represents San José State University in NCAA Division I college baseball as a member of the Mountain West Conference.

San Jose State fielded its first baseball team in 1890, although the current SJSU baseball media guide only provides records dating back to 1911. The team plays its home games at San Jose Municipal Stadium in San Jose, California. The team formerly played select home games at Blethen Field, which was located on San Jose State's south campus. In 2014, SJSU released plans to build a new baseball stadium to replace Blethen Field.

History
The team first took the field in 1890. Known back then as the Normalites, the men's baseball beat a local high school team in the first recognized game. From 1911 through the 2013 season, the SJSU baseball team compiled a win–loss record of 1,878–1,696 (.525).

From 1965–2021, 104 Spartans were taken in the Major League Baseball draft and 19 were signed by MLB teams. As of 2021, seven former Spartans are active professional baseball players in both major and minor leagues.

The Spartan baseball team has made NCAA Tournament appearances in 1955, 1971, 2000 and 2002. In 2000, the team advanced to the College World Series.

From 1997–2013, the SJSU baseball team competed in the Western Athletic Conference, earning three WAC pennants in 1997, 2000 and 2009.

Under head coach and SJSU alumnus Sam Piraro (1987–2012), the SJSU baseball team reached the 30-win mark 17 times (including five 40+ wins seasons) and appeared in the national rankings 47 times.

The SJSU baseball team has fielded 16 All-Americans including four first-team selections.

All-time record vs. current Mountain West teams

As of the conclusion of the 2019 NCAA Division I baseball season:

San Jose State in the NCAA Tournament

The Spartans are 7–10 (.412) all-time in the NCAA Division I Baseball Championship.

Major League Baseball

San José State has had 96 Major League Baseball draft selections since the draft began in 1965.

Making it to Omaha
Under the direction of head coach Sam Piraro, the Spartans played in the College World Series in 2000 in Omaha, Nebraska. The eight teams who accompanied the Spartans in Omaha were Clemson, Florida State, Louisiana State, Stanford, Texas, Louisiana-Lafayette, and the University of Southern California. San Jose State was eliminated after the first round of the tournament by the number four seed, the Clemson Tigers.

See also
List of NCAA Division I baseball programs

References

External links
 

 
Baseball teams established in 1911
1911 establishments in California